Donni Dio Hasibuan (born March 23, 1998) is an Indonesian professional footballer who plays as a midfielder for Persiraja Banda Aceh.

Career

Early career 
Donni started his football career from SSB Sinar Sakti, then SSB Cikal Garuda, PSMS Junior, and PPLP Sumut. He was elected to be the best player in the PSMS club campus.

Personal life 

Donni was born in Baganbatu, the first child of two brothers his parents named Ari Hasibuan and Neng Hayati.

References

External links 
 Donni Dio Hasibuan profile at liga-indonesia.id.
 

PSMS Medan players
Pro Duta FC players
Liga 1 (Indonesia) players
Liga 2 (Indonesia) players
Indonesian footballers
Sportspeople from Riau
Living people
1997 births
Association football midfielders